Cartoon Studio and similar may mean:
animation studio, the generic animation concept
comics studio, the generic comics concept

Studios

DisneyToon Studios, the direct-to-video cartoon studio for Walt Disney Corporation
Metro-Goldwyn-Mayer cartoon studio, the MGM Studios cartoon studio
Paramount Cartoon Studios, the Paramaout Studios cartoon studio
Universal Cartoon Studios, the Universal Studios cartoon studio

Other

Toon Studio, a new land at Walt Disney Studios Park in Disneyland Paris, France
The Simpsons: Cartoon Studio, a software program

See also
 Warner Bros. Cartoons and Warner Bros. Animation, the cartoon studios of Warner Bros. owned by WarnerMedia
 Walt Disney Animation Studios, the cartoon studio for Walt Disney Studios, owned by The Walt Disney Company
 Cartoon Network Studios, Cartoon Network's cartoon studios
 Cartoon Network Development Studio Europe
 Scottish Cartoon Art Studio